A set of rules for conducting World War II style miniature wargaming combat with 1:285 scale micro armour miniatures published by GHQ in 2001.

The core mechanic differentiating the game from other similar rules sets is the concept of "cohesion," which "represents the individual stands' abilities to receive, comprehend, and reasonably attempt to execute the orders given to them either by their own commander or some higher authority," writes rules author John Fernandes.

The game is published by GHQ, the company which trademarked the term "micro armour", which now has become a generalized term for miniature models used for war-gaming purposes (along with the non trademarked terms such as "micro armor", "mini tanks", etc.)

External links

Notes

Miniature wargames
Playscale miniaturism
Wargames introduced in the 2000s